

Lake Ambale or Lac Ambale is a lake situated in the Democratic Republic of the Congo. The lake is near Kotomanga, Awele, and Wuluwu Deuxième.

References

Lakes of the Democratic Republic of the Congo